Kevin Sandoval Shannon (born 18 August 1962 in Guatemala City) is a former Guatemalan footballer.

International career
Sandoval member of the Guatemala national team who played at the 1988 Summer Olympics in Seoul, Korea., coming in as substitute in two matches, against Iraq and Zambia. He has also represented his country in two FIFA World Cup qualification matches.

Retirement
After retiring from football, Sandoval attended and graduated from the University of Missouri in Columbia, Missouri. He then relocated to Chicago, Illinois.

References

1962 births
Living people
Sportspeople from Guatemala City
Guatemalan footballers
Guatemala international footballers
Olympic footballers of Guatemala
Footballers at the 1988 Summer Olympics
Aurora F.C. players
Comunicaciones F.C. players
C.S.D. Municipal players
University of Missouri alumni
Association football forwards